Trinidad Rizal y Alonso (June 6, 1868 – May 9, 1951), commonly known as Trinidad Rizal, was a Filipina feminist leader and co-founder of the Philippines' first feminist organization, the Asociación Femenista Filipina. She was the younger sister of the national hero, physician and writer, Dr. José Rizal.

Life and work 
Trinidad was born in Calamba, Laguna on June 6, 1868. She was the tenth child of Francisco Rizal Mercado and Teodora Alonso Realonda.

Trinidad helped found the first Masonic lodge for women in the Philippines. She was also a member of Walana, a Filipino masonry society, formed in Manila on July 18, 1893, closely allied with the masonic temples of the ilustrados.

In 1905, Trinidad co-founded the first Filipina feminist organization, the Asociación Feminista Filipina (AFF), along with Concepción Felix, Librada Avelino, María Paz Guanzon, and Luisa de Silyar, among others. In addition to encouraging women to participate in politics and public service, the organization promoted women's health. Trinidad participated in a subproject of AFF, Gota de Leche (also called La Protección de la Infancia), which focused on improving reproductive and maternal, infant, and child health.

Like her sister, Josefa Rizal, Trinidad never married. She died in Manila on May 9, 1951. She was buried in Manila's North Cemetery (Cemeterio del Norte) on May 11, 1951. Her remains were later exhumed, along with those of sister Narcisa, and relocated to the General Paciano Rizal shrine in Los Baños, Laguna.

Relationship with José Rizal 
In a letter from  Germany, dated March 11, 1886, her brother, José, complained of not having heard from her. He went on to praise the intelligent simplicity of German women and urged Trinidad to take her studies seriously while still in her youth, lamenting that Trinidad was "dominated by indolence." The letter, written a couple months before her eighteenth birthday, revealed that José had not seen his sister since she was very young.

Trinidad and her sisters sought information about birth control, breast feeding, and pain reduction during childbirth from brother, José, while he studied in Europe to become a doctor.

Trinidad visited José the day before his execution, accompanying their mother, Teodora Alonso, and sisters Lucía, Josefa, María, and Narcisa, to say goodbye and collect his belongings. Several historical accounts tell that José gave his stove (others call it a lamp) to Trinidad, telling her something important lay inside. Legend has it that this important something was her brother's last poem, "Mi último adiós" / "My last farewell." He had hidden the paper so well that his sisters had to use their hairpins to unfold it.

Before his death, José wrote to Trinidad to express his wish that the Rizal family treat his common-law wife, Josephine Bracken, kindly for her devotion to him. Following his execution, Trinidad accompanied Josephine and brother, Paciano, to Cavite where they met revolutionary leader Andrés Bonifacio and passed to him a copy of José's final poem.

The U.S. government informed the Philippine government, in 1908, that an American collector owned the original manuscript of the poem, which had left the Philippines with Josephine Bracken, in 1897. They now wanted to sell it to the Philippine government for $500. Trinidad was the one to verify the manuscript as the original before it was purchased and placed in the Philippine National Library.

References

1868 births
1951 deaths
People from Calamba, Laguna
Filipino feminists
José Rizal